Zotheca  is a genus of moths of the family Noctuidae.

Species
 Zotheca tranquilla Grote, 1874

References
Natural History Museum Lepidoptera genus database
Zotheca at funet

Hadeninae